Lozoya is a municipality in the Community of Madrid, Spain. The municipality covers an area of 57.94 km2. It is located at 1,116 metres above sea level.

References 

Municipalities in the Community of Madrid